Bartłomiej Żynel (born 9 April 1998) is a Polish professional footballer who plays as a goalkeeper for Polish Ekstraklasa club Jagiellonia Białystok.

Club career
He made his Austrian Football First League debut for FC Liefering on 19 May 2017 in a game against WSG Wattens.

On 28 July 2022, he returned to Jagiellonia on a one-year contract with an extension option, joining their reserve team with plans to train with senior team.

Honours

Club
Red Bull Salzburg Youth
UEFA Youth League: 2016–17

References

External links
 

1998 births
Sportspeople from Białystok
Living people
Association football goalkeepers
Polish footballers
Poland youth international footballers
Jagiellonia Białystok players
FC Liefering players
Wisła Płock players
2. Liga (Austria) players
Ekstraklasa players
III liga players
Polish expatriate footballers
Expatriate footballers in Austria
Polish expatriate sportspeople in Austria